Ng Siu-hong is a former District Councillor for the Mid Levels East constituency in Hong Kong. He is a member of the Democratic Party. He won the seat in the 2015 District Council elections with 50.9% (1,521 votes) of the vote with a gain of 3.3%. In the 2019 elections he increased his vote to 57.28% (2,672 votes) with a gain of 6.38%. In June 2018 he was attacked by a resident in an issue related to local liquor licences.

On 29 April 2021, he announced on his Facebook that he decided to resign as a member of Central and Western District Council, effective from May.

References 

Democratic Party (Hong Kong) politicians
District councillors of Central and Western District
Living people
Year of birth missing (living people)